Junge is a surname. Notable people with the surname include:

Daniel Junge, American filmmaker
Eric Junge (born 1977), American baseball player
Frank Junge (born 1967), German politician
George Junge (1905-1962), Dutch ornithologist
Hans Hermann Junge (1914-1944), SS-officer, valet to Adolf Hitler, husband of Traudl Junge
Klaus Junge (1924-1945), German chess master
Sofie Junge Pedersen (born 1992), Danish soccer player
Traudl Junge (1920-2002), German, private secretary to Adolf Hitler